Neoregelia sanguinea is a species of flowering plant in the genus Neoregelia. This species is endemic to Brazil.

Cultivars 
 Neoregelia 'Cat in the Hat'
 Neoregelia 'Kokopelli'
 Neoregelia 'Leopard Eyes'
 Neoregelia 'Phaser'

References 
BSI Cultivar Registry Retrieved 11 October 2009

Flora of Brazil
sanguinea